Sanjaya Baru is a political commentator and policy analyst. He served as Secretary General of the Federation of Indian Chambers of Commerce and Industry (FICCI) until his resignation in April 2018. Prior to this, he was Director for Geo-Economics and Strategy at the International Institute of Strategic Studies. He was Prime Minister Manmohan Singh's media advisor and chief spokesperson (PMO) from May 2004 until August 2008.  He has also served as associate editor at The Economic Times and The Times of India, and then chief editor at Business Standard. Baru writes a column for Civil Society Magazine called Delhi Darbar. His father B. P. R. Vithal was Finance and Planning Secretary during Dr. Manmohan Singh's tenure as Secretary of Finance in the Government of India.

The Accidental Prime Minister 

In April 2014, Penguin India published The Accidental Prime Minister, Baru's tell-all memoir about his time at the Prime Minister's Office. In it, Baru alleges that the prime minister was completely subservient to Congress President Sonia Gandhi, who wielded significant influence in the running of the Singh administration, including the PMO itself. The book sparked off a controversy, with the office officially denouncing it as "fiction". Baru has said that he set out to show an empathetic portrait of the prime minister.

Works 
 The Political Economy of Indian Sugar: State Intervention and Structural Change (1990)
 Strategic consequences of India's economic performance (2006)
 The Accidental Prime Minister: The Making and Unmaking of Manmohan Singh 
 1991: How P.V. Narasimha Rao Made History by Sanjaya Baru (2016)
 India and the World: Essays on Geoeconomics and Foreign Policy (2016)
 India's Power Elite (2021)

In popular culture
Based on Baru's book The Accidental Prime Minister Rudra Production Limited and Pen Studios released a film of the same name in January 2019 in which he has been portrayed by Akshaye Khanna.

References

External links

Living people
Jawaharlal Nehru University alumni
Indian male journalists
Indian newspaper journalists
Indian political journalists
Manmohan Singh administration
Academics of the University of East Anglia
21st-century Indian journalists
Year of birth missing (living people)